Eupithecia albimedia is a moth in the family Geometridae. It is found in south-western China (Sichuan, Yunnan).

The wingspan is about 18–21 mm. The forewings are yellowish tan brown and the hindwings are dirty white, darkening somewhat towards the terminal area.

References

Moths described in 2005
albimedia
Moths of Asia